Nagasaka was a Japanese missionary who brought Protestant Christianity to Korea.  He first arrived in Korea in 1883.

References

Evangelists
Japanese Protestant missionaries
Protestant missionaries in Korea
Japanese expatriates in Korea